Eris O'Brien  (20 September 1895 – 28 Feb 1974) was an Australian prelate of the Catholic Church and historian. He was Auxiliary Bishop of Sydney, New South Wales, Australia (1948–1951) and the second archbishop of the Canberra-Goulburn (1953–1966).

Early life
Eris Michael O'Brien was born in Condobolin, New South Wales,  the eldest of three children of Terence O'Brien, a native-born police constable, and his Irish-born wife Bertha, née Conroy. The family moved to Sydney and Eris studied at St Aloysius' College. After training at St Patrick's Seminary, Manly he was ordained a priest in 1918.

Priesthood
O'Brien served in several Sydney parishes and wrote two books on the history of the Catholic Church in nineteenth-century Australia,  The Life and Letters of Archpriest John Joseph Therry (1922, also titled The Foundation of Catholicism in Australia), and The Dawn of Catholicism in Australia, the story of Fr Jeremiah O'Flynn (1928).

In 1934 he was granted leave to attend the Catholic University of Louvain, Belgium, where he gained a Ph.D. (1936), and the National University of Ireland, Dublin, where he gained an M.A. His resulting book, The Foundation of Australia (1786-1800) (London, 1937), was well received.
In 1940 he was instrumental in founding the Australian Catholic Historical Society.

Back in Sydney he lectured part-time at Sydney University and was parish priest of Bankstown and Neutral Bay.

Auxiliary Bishop of Sydney
O'Brien was consecrated Auxiliary Bishop of Sydney in 1948. The same year he was a member of the Australian delegation to the third session of the United Nations General Assembly in Paris and sat on the committee dealing with human rights. He became Auxiliary Archbishop of Sydney in 1951.

Archbishop of Canberra-Goulburn
O'Brien was made Archbishop of Canberra-Goulburn in 1953 and dealt with rapid expansion of church parishes and schools in Canberra. He cautiously supported the Goulburn School Strike in 1962, which protested against lack of subsidies to Church schools and played a role in gaining state aid for Church schools

Death
The Archbishop resigned in 1967 due to failing health and moved back to Sydney. He died in Richmond, New South Wales in 1974, and was interred in St Christopher's Cathedral, Canberra.

References

External links
Catholic-Hierarchy
Australian Dictionary of Biography

1895 births
1975 deaths
Catholic University of Leuven (1834–1968) alumni
Roman Catholic archbishops of Canberra and Goulburn
Participants in the Second Vatican Council
Australian Companions of the Order of St Michael and St George
20th-century Roman Catholic bishops in Australia
People educated at St Aloysius' College (Sydney)
20th-century Australian historians